Farida Benyahia is an Algerian magistrate and president of the Council of State of Algeria.

She was appointed in 2019 by President Abdelmadjid Tebboune. After her installation as president of Council of State, she declared that she would go after loot funds and recover them.

Career 
Benyahia career began in 1975 holding positions including prosecutor at the court of Constantine, advisor to the president of chamber at the court of Constantine and adviser to the president of Council of State before being appointed President of the Council in 2019.

References 

Algerian judges
Living people
Year of birth missing (living people)
Women judges
21st-century Algerian women